Next Generation or Next Gen ATP Finals is an annual year-end men's youth exhibition tennis tournament for the best 21-and-under players of the season. Since its founding, the event has taken place in Milan, Italy.

Ranking points, prize money and other features
The tournament does not distribute points for the ATP rankings for the participants. The ATP does not count it as an official ATP Tour tournament victory, but matches count towards official win–loss season record. Prize money worth US $2,275,000 is distributed and counts to the players' totals. From the beginning, the tournament regularly has incorporated new and experimental features that may or may not be introduced into other tennis events later on. It pioneered the implementation of electronic line-calling (so called 'Hawk-Eye Live' completely replacing human line-judges) back in 2017. Other experimental features include scoring systems different from recognized tennis matches, players communicating with their coaches via headphones, and so on.

History
Following a competitive bid process, the Association of Tennis Professionals (ATP) announced that the Italian Tennis Federation, in association with the Italian Olympic Committee, would organise a new ATP tournament featuring the world’s top 21-and-under singles players of the ATP Tour season. The first four editions of the Tournament were hosted in Milan, Italy from 2017 to 2021. Already in the first year, a special circumstance occurred. The 20-year-old Alexander Zverev played such a successful season that he was qualified at the same time for the Next Generation ATP Finals and for the ATP Finals of the best eight players from 2017. As the events were dated close and scheduled directly one after the other, the Hamburg native opted for the latter option.

Format
Played over five days, the format for the competition consists of two round robin groups, followed by the semi-finals and final. Played on a singles-only court, the competition features the best seven qualified 21-and-under players of the season, plus one wild card.

Rules
A number of rule changes from the normal ATP format are used for the competition:

Best of five sets
First to four games in each set
Tiebreak at 3-All
No-Ad scoring (server’s choice in  2019, receiver's choice in 2018) 
Lets on serve (in 2018 lets on serve were counted "in")
Live Electronic line calling/Hawkeye-Live (graphic shown on screens after a "close call")
Start match 4 minutes from entry of second player on court (5 minutes in 2018)

Shot clock to ensure 25-second rule
Maximum of one medical timeout per player per match
Coaches can talk to players through headsets
Public will be allowed to move around during a match (except at baselines)
Towel boxes at each baseline
Players can use wearable technology

Qualification
The Top 7 players in the Emirates ATP Race to Milan will qualify. The eighth spot will be reserved for a wild card, the winner of a qualifying tournament. Eligible players must be 21-and-under as of the end of that calendar year (born 2001 or later for 2022 edition).

Results

Singles

Next Gen ATP Finals appearances

Note
When there are more than eight players listed for any year, it is usually due to withdrawal by one or more players because of injury. When a player withdraws early in the tournament, his place is filled by the next-highest qualifier. Participants are listed in order of number of appearances and best result. The 2020 edition was not played due to the COVID-19 pandemic.
{|class="sortable wikitable nowrap"
!Player
!#
!Bestresult
!YearsYear of best result  (Wins in bold)
!Qualified  but not played 
!W–L
|-
| Brandon Nakashima
|2
|bgcolor=00ff00|W
|2021, 2022
|–
|7–2
|-
| Andrey Rublev
|2
|bgcolor=D8BFD8|F
|2017, 2018
|–
|6–4
|-
| Alex de Minaur
|2
|bgcolor=D8BFD8|F
|2018, 2019
|–
|8–2
|-
| Frances Tiafoe
|2
|bgcolor=yellow|SF
|2018, 2019
|–
|3–4
|-
| Lorenzo Musetti
|2
|bgcolor=afeeee|RR
|2021, 2022
|–
|2–4
|-
| Chung Hyeon
|1
|bgcolor=00ff00|W
|2017
|–
|5–0
|-
| Stefanos Tsitsipas
|1
|bgcolor=00ff00|W
|2018
|2019
|5–0
|-
| Jannik Sinner
|1
|bgcolor=00ff00|W
|2019(WC)
|2021, 2022
|4–1
|-
| Carlos Alcaraz
|1
|bgcolor=00ff00|W
|2021
|2022
|5–0
|-
| Sebastian Korda
|1
|bgcolor=D8BFD8|F
|2021
|–
|4–1
|-
| Jiří Lehečka
|1
|bgcolor=D8BFD8|F
|2022
|–
|3–2
|-
| Daniil Medvedev
|1
|bgcolor=e5b47d|3
|2017(A')
|–
|2–2
|-
| Borna Ćorić
|1
|bgcolor=ffebcd|4
|2017
|–
|3–1
|-
| Jaume Munar
|1
|bgcolor=ffebcd|4
|2018(A')
|–
|1–4
|-
| Miomir Kecmanović
|1
|bgcolor=yellow|SF
|2019(A')
|–
|2–2
|-
| Sebastián Báez
|1
|bgcolor=yellow|SF
|2021(A')
|–
|2–2
|-
| Dominic Stricker
|1
|bgcolor=yellow|SF
|2022(A')
|–
|3–1
|-
| Jack Draper
|1
|bgcolor=yellow|SF
|2022
|–
|2–2
|-
| Karen Khachanov
|1
|bgcolor=afeeee|RR
|2017
|–
|1–2
|-
| Denis Shapovalov
|1
|bgcolor=afeeee|RR
|2017
|2018, 2019
|1–2
|-
| Jared Donaldson
|1
|bgcolor=afeeee|RR
|2017
|–
|0–3
|-
| Gianluigi Quinzi
|1
|bgcolor=afeeee|RR
|2017(WC)
|–
|0–3
|-
| Taylor Fritz
|1
|bgcolor=afeeee|RR
|2018
|–
|1–2
|-
| Liam Caruana
|1
|bgcolor=afeeee|RR
|2018(WC)
|–
|0–3
|-
| Hubert Hurkacz
|1
|bgcolor=afeeee|RR
|2018(A')
|–
|1–2
|-
| Ugo Humbert
|1
|bgcolor=afeeee|RR
|2019
|–
|1–2
|-
| Casper Ruud
|1
|bgcolor=afeeee|RR
|2019
|–
|1–2
|-
| Mikael Ymer
|1
|bgcolor=afeeee|RR
|2019(A')
|–
|1–2
|-
| Alejandro Davidovich Fokina
|1
|bgcolor=afeeee|RR
|2019(A')
|–
|1–2
|-
| Juan Manuel Cerúndolo
|1
|bgcolor=afeeee|RR
|2021
|–
|0–3
|-
| Holger Rune
|1
|bgcolor=afeeee|RR
|2021(A')
|2022
|1–2
|-
| Hugo Gaston
|1
|bgcolor=afeeee|RR
|2021(A')
|–
|0–3
|-
| Francesco Passaro
|1
|bgcolor=afeeee|RR
|2022(A')
|–
|1–2
|-
| Tseng Chun-hsin
|1
|bgcolor=afeeee|RR
|2022
|–
|0–3
|-
| Matteo Arnaldi
|1
|bgcolor=afeeee|RR
|2022(A')
|–
|0–3
|-
| Alexander Zverev
|0
|–
|–
|2017, 2018
|0–0
|-
| Félix Auger-Aliassime
|0
|–
|–
|2019, 2021
|0–0
|-
| Jenson Brooksby
|0
|–
|–
|2021
|0–0
|}

Subsequent achievements of Next Gen ATP Finals players
Rankings
World No. 1s

 Grand Slams  
 Grand Slam winners 

Grand Slam finalistsBold:''' Player won the tournament
Number of titles won are within parentheses

See also
ATP rankings
ATP Finals

References

Next Generation ATP Finals
ATP Tour
Under-21 sport
Recurring sporting events established in 2017
2017 establishments in Italy
Junior tennis